The 2005–06 Memphis Tigers men's basketball team represented the University of Memphis in the 2005–06 college basketball season, the 85th season of Tiger basketball. The Tigers were coached by sixth-year head coach John Calipari, and they played their home games at the FedExForum in Memphis, Tennessee.

Recruiting

Roster

Schedule

|-
!colspan=9| Regular Season

|-
!colspan=9| 2006 Conference USA Men's Basketball Tournament

|-
!colspan=9| 2006 NCAA tournament'''

References

Memphis Tigers men's basketball seasons
Memphis
Memphis
Memphis
Memphis